Chitali, is a village in Rahata taluka of Ahmednagar district in Indian state of Maharashtra.

Location
Chitali is located to the eastern part of Rahata taluka and shares border with Shrirampur taluka. Wakadi, Jalgaon, Nimgaon Khairi are the nearby villages.

Demographics
As per 2011 census, population of Chitali is 4609. Male constitute 2415 and female constitute 2194. Literacy rate of village is 72%.

Economy
Agriculture and allied works are the main occupation of village. John Distilleries has manufacturing unit in Chitali village.

Transport

Road
Chitali is connected to Rahata and Nimgaon Khairi by district road.

Rail
Chitali station is located within village limit.

Air
Shirdi Airport is nearest airport to the village.

See also
List of villages in Rahata taluka

References 

Villages in Ahmednagar district